Edvin Tiemroth (18 February 1915 – 16 November 1984) was a Danish actor and film director. He appeared in 15 films between 1939 and 1976. He also directed 13 films between 1954 and 1974. His 1960 co-directed film The Last Winter was entered into the 2nd Moscow International Film Festival.

Selected filmography

 Affæren i Mølleby (1976)
 Kassen stemmer (1976)
 Askepot (1973)
 The Last Winter (1960)
 Ditte menneskebarn (1946)
 Så mødes vi hos Tove (1946)
 Den usynlige hær (1945)
 Biskoppen (1944)
 Naar man kun er ung (1943)
 Mine kære koner (1943)
 Erik Ejegods pilgrimsfærd (1943)
 Ballade i Nyhavn (1942)
 Et skud før midnat (1942)
 Far skal giftes (1941)
 Jeg har elsket og levet (1940)
 En lille tilfældighed (1939)

References

External links

1915 births
1984 deaths
Danish male film actors
Danish film directors
Male actors from Copenhagen
20th-century Danish male actors